Boitumelo Mafoko (born 11 February 1982) is a Botswana footballer who played in his homecountry as well as for Santos in the South African Premier Soccer League.

References

External links

1982 births
Living people
Botswana footballers
Botswana expatriate footballers
Botswana international footballers
Expatriate soccer players in South Africa
Botswana expatriate sportspeople in South Africa
South African Premier Division players
Township Rollers F.C. players
Santos F.C. (South Africa) players
Botswana Defence Force XI F.C. players
Jwaneng Galaxy F.C. players
2012 Africa Cup of Nations players
Association football midfielders